Parandhu Sella Vaa is a 2016 Indian Tamil language romantic comedy film directed by Dhanapal Padmanaban. The film stars Luthfudeen, Aishwarya Rajesh and Narelle Kheng in the leading roles. Featuring music composed by Joshua Sridhar, the film began production during January 2016.

Cast 

Luthfudeen as Sampath
Aishwarya Rajesh as Madhavi
Narelle Kheng as Min Yuan / Lily Chan
Karunakaran as Arun
RJ Balaji as Markandeyan (Mark)
Sathish as Mani
Joe Malloori as Douglas
G. Gnanasambandam as Sampath's father
Ponnambalam as Ponnambalam
T. M. Karthik as Vivek
Manobala
Suganya Raja as Vidhya
Anandhi as Radha
Udaya Soundari as Sanghavi
Sujatha Sivakumar as Sampath's mother

Production 
In December 2015, Dhanapal Padamanaban revealed that he would be making a romantic comedy film set in Singapore featuring Luthfudeen Baasha, who was earlier seen in Saivam (2014), in the lead role for the first time. Aishwarya Rajesh and Salony Luthra were selected to play the lead actresses, while the team revealed that they were searching for one more heroine. Satish, Karunakaran and RJ Balaji signed on to play supporting characters, while Singaporean actors Guna, Mathi, Udaya soundari and Sukanya were also selected to portray supporting roles in the film. Production started for the film in January 2016 in Singapore. Salony Luthra opted out the film soon after production began, citing that the director had changed the story from the initial narration of the film she had heard. Singaporean actress Narelle Kheng subsequently replaced her in the role. After completing production without a title, it was later named as Parandhu Sella Vaa, taken from the title of a song from Mani Ratnam's O Kadhal Kanmani (2015).

The soundtrack and trailer for the film were revealed in a ceremony held in Singapore during June 2016, where Singaporean MPs Vikram Nair, Ganesh Rajaram and R. Dhinakaran were invited as chief guests.

Soundtrack
Soundtrack was composed by Joshua Sridhar.
Yaarume Thaniyaai - Haricharan
Nadhiyil Vizhundha - Shweta Mohan
Man Meedhu - Rajesh Krishnan
Kaatril Aeri - Joshua Sridhar, Lady Kash
Sillendru - Sathyaprakash, MM Manasi
Rules Maathi - Santhosh Jayakaran, Suvi

Release 
The Times of India gave the film two out of five stars and wrote that "Much of it feels like an aimless drifting of one scene after another, with randomly placed songs and stunts". The satellite rights of the film were sold to Colors Tamil

References

External links 
 

2016 films
2010s Tamil-language films
Films set in Singapore
Films shot in Singapore
Films scored by Joshua Sridhar